Stand Up and Scream is the debut studio album by British rock band Asking Alexandria. It was released on 15 September 2009 through Sumerian Records and was produced by Joey Sturgis. The album has charted at number 170 on the Billboard 200, number 29 on Top Independent albums, and number 4 on Top Heatseekers. The record managed to remain at the Top Heatseekers chart at position number 36 until the end of July 2010.

Background
The title of the album is chosen from a lyric in the second track "The Final Episode (Let's Change the Channel)", where the relevant line within the chorus reads "Just stand up and scream, the tainted clock is counting down".

Six of the tracks featured on the album have previously been released digitally through the band's MySpace and PureVolume accounts. These include, "Nobody Don't Dance No More", "The Final Episode (Let's Change the Channel)", "A Candlelit Dinner with Inamorta", "Not the American Average", "A Single Moment of Sincerity", and "I Was Once, Possibly, Maybe, Perhaps, a Cowboy King". When downloaded, the ID3 tags displayed Demo or Demo 2008 as the songs relevant album. There are both minor and more noticeable alterations in all of the songs released on the album in comparison to those released digitally in 2008.

The song "Hey There Mr. Brooks" is written as a homage to the film, Mr. Brooks. Its lyrics feature many references to scenes in the film.

Music videos
In September 2009, Asking Alexandria shot their debut music video for the song "The Final Episode (Let's Change the Channel)". In the video, the musicians play in a dark room, dressed in black. Also shown is a table, on which stands the glass with water. Throughout the video, the glass gradually shifts to the edge of the table and finally falls down and breaks in the end.

In 2010, the music video for "A Prophecy" was released. It was filmed in Los Angeles in its entirety during the band's headlining tour, "Welcome to the Circus", in between tour dates. It features the band playing in a dark alley during a storm, and cuts between shots of the band and a woman falling through the ocean. There is also a shot of James Cassells spitting fire towards the end before the last breakdown.

In 2010, Asking Alexandria shot a performance video of "If You Can't Ride Two Horses at Once... You Should Get Out of the Circus" at Chain Reaction in Long Beach, California. It is included on their EP, Life Gone Wild.

During the Epicenter 2011, Asking Alexandria shot a performance video for "Not the American Average".

Critical reception

AllMusic criticized the album's tracks as "faceless and unmemorable".

Track listing

Personnel

Asking Alexandria
 Danny Worsnop – lead vocals, keyboards, programming 
 Ben Bruce – lead guitar, backing vocals, keyboards, programming, co-lead vocals on tracks 8 and 9
 Cameron Liddell – rhythm guitar
 Sam Bettley – bass
 James Cassells – drums

Additional musicians
 Shawn Milke of Alesana – guest vocals on "Hey There Mr. Brooks"

Additional personnel
 Joey Sturgis – production, engineering, mixing, mastering
 Nick Sampson – additional editing
 Sons of Nero – artwork
 Phill Mamula – photography
 Amanda Fiore and Ash Avildsen – art conception
 RED Distribution – distribution

Charts

References

2009 debut albums
Asking Alexandria albums
Sumerian Records albums
Albums produced by Joey Sturgis